The 2015 International Premier Tennis League season (2015 IPTL season, officially the 2015 Coca-Cola International Premier Tennis League Presented by Qatar Airways season pursuant to sponsorship agreements with The Coca-Cola Company and Qatar Airways) is the second season of the professional team tennis league contested by five teams in Asia.

Format
The teams compete in a customized round robin format of matches in each host country. The top two teams at the end of the round robin stage qualify for the final. The winner of the final is declared the champion.

In the 2015 season, the league has terminated the "last set importance" which gave the trailing team an opportunity to continue playing if they win the fifth set as played out in the 2014 season. In the 2015 season, the fifth set continues in the conventional way, where the first team to score 6 games wins the set, with a 13-point tie-breaker to decide the winner, if the two teams are tied at 5–5.

If the two teams are tied (in terms of games won) at the end of the five Sets, a super shoot-out is played in a men's singles format to determine the winner of the match. It is played as a 19-point super tiebreaker. The first team to win 10 points, 9–9 final point wins the Super Shoot-Out and hence the Match. A 2-point difference is not required, and it is not time bound (unlike the 2014 season). The match-winner is the team that wins the most games and hence points, at the end of the five sets.

The league standings are determined on the basis of the win–loss percentage of overall games won versus lost therefore making every game played count. The two teams with the best percentage ratios qualify for the finals. In the event that two teams are tied for the second place, the following criteria determines which team qualifies for the finals:
 head-to-head results
 largest winning margin, by games, in any single match
 coin toss

Teams
Five teams will compete in the 2015 IPTL season. Japan Warriors is set to become the fifth team to participate at the IPTL.

 Indian Aces
 Philippine Mavericks
 Singapore Slammers
 UAE Royals
 Japan Warriors

Draft results
Novak Djokovic pulled out of the tournament and was replaced by Andy Murray and Stan Wawrinka by Singapore Slammers. Dustin Brown replaced Thanasi Kokkinakis. Milos Raonic replaced Borna Ćorić. Édouard Roger-Vasselin replaced Jo-Wilfried Tsonga. Philipp Kohlschreiber replaced Vasek Pospisil. Pierre-Hugues Herbert replaced Lucas Pouille. Mirjana Lučić-Baroni replaced  Daniela Hantuchová. Alja Tomljanović replaced Sabine Lisicki.

Calendar

Results

Results table

Notes

 Due to the odd number of teams through this Season, one team plays an extra match. That team will be allowed to drop their score on any one match through the Season provided they inform this intent soon after the match is completed. This Season, the team that plays the extra match is the Obi UAE Royals. The Obi UAE Royals have chosen to drop their score on the match played against the Philippine Mavericks on December 6, 2015 in Manila. The score for the Philippine Mavericks however does count towards their Win Percentage.

Standings
Standings are determined by percentage of games won. Top two teams qualify for final.

Position summary
The following table shows the day-by-day position of each team in the league standings.

Teams head-to-head

2015 International Premier Tennis League season

Final

The final was held at the Singapore Indoor Stadium on 20 December In Singapore.

After an 18-day 5-nation tour the Indian Aces, with 8 eight wins out of 11 this season, and the Singapore Slammers, last on the league table in first edition, but finishing a strong second this season, played the final of a prize money of USD 1 million (USD 500,000 for the runners-up), which was won by the Slammers 26-21.

The Most Valuable Player (MVP) (Male) for IPTL 2015 was Ivan Dodig (Aces) whilst Belinda Bencic (Slammers) was adjudged the MVP (Female) for their performances through the season. 

On behalf of the League, Founder and Managing Director, Mahesh Bhupathi said “We got off to a great start last year, added another team in the second year, were broadcast in 155 countries across the world – so it speaks well for the success for the IPTL. Next year is an Olympic year, so I don’t see us adding another team, but we’ll continue building on from here.”

What the Players said:

Stan Wawrinka: “Do not be fooled: everybody knows why we play this event."

Marcelo Melo: “Stan asked to play with me, which was great. He’s such a great player. I think he helped me more today than I helped him! It was great to have him as my doubles partner today!”

Nick Kyrgios: “Last year we had some good players but I don't think we had the same chemistry as a team, to be honest. We all got along pretty well from day one. Our energy on the bench was great and when we lost we supported each other and came back each day and gave our best. Every game counts so that was key. My team as a whole worked a lot better together this year.” He added, “For me this is a massive opportunity to be in the same team with Stan - Grand Slam Champion, Marcelo - number one doubles player in the world, Carlos - one of the greatest players to have ever played. For me sitting on the bench its massive watching them and seeing how they train. The relationships I now have. That's priceless!”

Dustin Brown: “It's been great. I watched IPTL last year on my TV so to be part of it this year it’s been great. Ii was very happy when I got the call after Wimbledon. Our team bonded really well and to be on personal terms with guys I used to only see on TV or play on the Play Station, is fantastic. It's great to be able to call these guys and ask for help. We have a really good chemistry on and off the court and that definitely made the difference in us getting the win today.”

Belinda Bencic: “I had a great year and I am very happy to have been in this position. It really helps me with next year and my preparations. I am really looking forward to 2016 and I'd like to be back for the IPTL.”

References

External links
 International Premier Tennis League official website

International Premier Tennis League season
International Premier Tennis League seasons
2015 in Asian sport